Basket Club Ferrara was an Italian professional basketball team based in Ferrara, Emilia-Romagna.

For past club sponsorship names, see sponsorship names.

History
Basket Club Ferrara was founded on 16 June 1999 and started playing in the third division Serie B d’Eccellenza that same season. It stayed another season in the league before moving up to the LegaDue in 2001.

Ferrara would win the LegaDue in 2007–08, obtaining a promotion to the first division Serie A where it stayed until 2010.
After the 2010–11 season, club president Roberto Mascellani sold the LegaDue sporting rights of Ferrara to Biancoblù Basket Bologna , effectively ending Ferrara's activity.
Pallacanestro Ferrara was formed soon after by a group of entrepreneurs who bought the fourth division Serie B sporting rights of Pallacanestro Budrio.
As of the 2015–16 season, this club plays in the second division Serie A2.
In 2016 the Under 20 youth team of Pallacanestro Ferrara won the Under 20 National Championship, taking the first National title to newly formed club.

Notable players 

  Monty Mack 1 season: '01-'02
  Frantz Pierre-Louis 1 season: '01-'02
  Terence Black 1 season: '01-'02
  Venson Hamilton 1 season: '01-'02
   Michael Williams 3 seasons: '02-'05
  Cristiano Grappasonni 2 seasons: '02-'04
  Brian Tolbert 1 season: '02-'03
  Albert Burditt 1 season: '02-'03
  Geno Carlisle 1 season: '02-'03
  Andrea Ghiacci 3 seasons: '03-'06
  Terrell McIntyre 1 season: '03-'04
  MC Mazique 1 season: '03-'04
  Jobey Thomas 2 seasons: '04-'06
  Glen Whisby 1 season: '04-'05
  Titus Ivory 1 season: '04-'05
  Leonardo Busca 1 season: '04-'05
  Brent Darby 1 season: '05-'06
  Paul Marigney 1 season: '06-'07

Sponsorship names
Throughout the years, due to sponsorship, the club had been known as:
Sinteco Ferrara (1999-02)
Carife Ferrara (2002–2010)
NaturHouse Ferrara (2010–2011)

References

External links 
Serie A historical profile  Retrieved 24 August 2015
Eurobasket.com profile

1999 establishments in Italy
2011 disestablishments in Italy
Basketball teams established in 1999
Basketball teams in Emilia-Romagna
Defunct basketball teams in Italy
Basketball teams disestablished in 2011